Worcester Air National Guard Station (also known as Worcester Air Station) is a closed United States Air Force station.  It was located in Worcester, Massachusetts, in Green Hill Park.  It was the home of the Massachusetts Air National Guard's 101st Air Control Squadron until 16 October 1998.

History
Worcester Air Station was located in the Green Hill Park section of Worcester, Massachusetts (50 Skyline Dr Worcester, MA 01605). When the 101st Air Control Squadron was inactivated on 16 October 1998, most of the Worcester Air National Guard Station was handed over to the State of Massachusetts. Today the City of Worcester Worcester Parks, Recreation & Cemetery Division occupies the former 101st Air Control Squadron Headquarters building. The former RADAR tower for the 101st Air Control Squadron can still be seen on the sight in a fenced in area just west of the Parks, Recreation & Cemetery Division building.

References

External links
The Commonwealth of Massachusetts Military Division Annual Report FY 1974
Massachusetts National Guard Biennial Report
City of Worcester Worcester Parks, Recreation & Cemetery Division

Installations of the United States Air National Guard
Installations of the United States Air Force in Massachusetts